Hardware Building may refer to:

 Hardware Building (Wadena, Iowa)
 Boggs Lumber and Hardware Building in Eckley, Colorado
 Briggs Hardware Building in Raleigh, North Carolina
 Doyle Hardware Building in Utica, New York
 Lipsett Hardware Building in Pickford, Michigan
 Loewenstein and Sons Hardware Building in Charleston, West Virginia
 Salt Lake Hardware Building in Salt Lake City, Utah